Roger Climpson  (born 18 October 1932) is an English-born Australian retired media personality who served a lengthy career in both radio and television, as a journalist, announcer, newsreader and 
presenter. He is best known for his time at Seven News in the 1980s and 1990s and for his hosting duties on shows from 1977 until 1998, such as the local version of This Is Your Life and true-crime series Australia's Most Wanted.

Early life 
Climpson was born on 18 October 1932 in Peterborough, England. The son of a butcher, he aimed to become a pilot in the Royal Air Force, until a rugby union accident at the age of 14 punctured his lung, leading him to take up acting instead of flying. He emigrated to Australia in 1949, and met his future wife Claire at a Christmas party in 1952. Climpson started his career in theatre radio

Television career 
Climpson began his television career in 1957, working at Channel Nine as an announcer, weatherman and newsreader. He got the job at Nine after asking his friend Brian Henderson to have a word with the head of the network, Bruce Gyngell. During his time at Nine, he hosted two programs of his own: Rendezvous with Roger and The House and Garden Show.

He left Channel Nine in 1965 after chairman Sir Frank Packer refused to grant him a five-pound pay rise. Climpson found himself briefly unemployed and worked at his father's butcher shop, until he was asked to fill a temporary newsreader role at Channel Seven – where he stayed for fifteen years.

In 1977, he began hosting This Is Your Life until returning to newsreading in 1978. In 1982, Climpson retired from television work, but returned to the station in 1989 as anchor of Sydney's Seven News, until a diagnosis of prostate cancer in November 1994 forced his temporary retirement. Ann Sanders replaced him the following year.

In 1997, he was host of Australia's Most Wanted, which lasted until 1998 when he retired from television.

Radio career 
In 1977, he was a presenter in the afternoon shift on Sydney's 2GB, which lasted for several years.

In recent years, Climpson has been heavily involved in Christian radio, and from 1995 until his retirement in 2004, was chairman of the Christian Broadcasting Association Ltd, licensee of Sydney Christian radio station Hope 103.2.

Honours 
On Australia Day 2004 he was awarded the Medal of the Order of Australia (OAM).

Selected credits

Newsreader

References

External links 

 Roger Climpson profile at Celebrity Speakers

1932 births
Living people
Seven News presenters
Recipients of the Medal of the Order of Australia
People from Peterborough